Thou Shalt Not Covet is a 1916 American silent drama film directed by Colin Campbell and starring Tyrone Power Sr., Kathlyn Williams, and Guy Oliver.

Cast
 Tyrone Power Sr. as I, or the Hero 
 Kathlyn Williams as My Neighbor's Wife 
 Guy Oliver as My Neighbor 
 Eugenie Besserer as My Wife

References

Bibliography
 Donald W. McCaffrey & Christopher P. Jacobs. Guide to the Silent Years of American Cinema. Greenwood Publishing, 1999.

External links
 

1916 films
1916 drama films
1910s English-language films
American silent feature films
Silent American drama films
American black-and-white films
Films directed by Colin Campbell
1910s American films